William H. Clapp (October 29, 1879 - April 21, 1954) was a Canadian-American painter and art curator. He was a member of the Society of Six in Oakland, California, and an Impressionist landscape painter. He was also the curator of the Oakland Art Gallery.

Life
Clapp was born on October 29, 1879 in Montreal, Canada. He was born a U.S. citizen as both his parents were American. He was trained by William Brymner in Montreal, and he spent four years in Paris, France, where he attended the Académie Julian, the Académie de la Grande Chaumière and the Académie Colarossi, and he was introduced to Fauvism. In 1906, he exhibited his work at the Salon d’Automne.

In France, his style was transformed into a personal form of Impressionism, verging on Pointillism, depicting the way in which he experienced and saw the world. He became mostly known for his brilliant, high-keyed, colourful landscapes inspired by Monet and for his interest in painting the figure, mostly academic-influenced and idealized nudes. In 1907, he travelled to Belgium and Spain, where he studied in Madrid with William Laparra and regularly visited the Prado Museum. Returning to Montreal in 1908, Clapp brought with him his innovative interpretation of Impressionism, applying it to Canadian subject matter, which received mixed and uncomprehending reactions from critics and the public. After exhibiting his work in Montreal in a solo exhibition in 1914, he left Canada and lived in Cuba from 1915 to 1917, then moved to Oakland, California, where he co-founded the Society of Six with Selden Connor Gile, August Gay, Maurice Logan, Louis Siegriest, and Bernard von Eichman, and he wrote their manifesto. From 1918 to 1952, he curated the Oakland Art Gallery, where he sold their paintings. Clapp was a member of the Canadian Art Club and the Royal Canadian Academy of Arts.

Clapp resided in Piedmont, California with his wife Gertrude. He died on April 21, 1954 in Oakland, California, at age 74. His artwork can be seen at the Smithsonian American Art Museum and the Musée national des beaux-arts du Québec.

Further reading

Note: the author, Lawrence Jeppson, lived 1926–2019 and the publication date given for the book has somehow been misdated at the source (Smithsonian Libraries).

References

1879 births
1954 deaths
Artists from Montreal
Canadian Impressionist painters
People from Piedmont, California
Académie Julian alumni
Alumni of the Académie de la Grande Chaumière
Académie Colarossi alumni
Artists from Oakland, California
American Impressionist painters
American landscape painters
20th-century American painters
Canadian emigrants to the United States